Kishkinta was a theme park located in Chennai, India. It was founded by Navodaya Appachan, the owner of Navodaya Studio. This Park spread across 120 acres of vast area with a scenic landscape, bushes, fountains, decorations and designs. Along with these, the park had various entertainment places of Wave pools, water rides, roller coasters, toy trains etc. especially for children who visit for picnics. It was named after the fabled simian kingdom in the epic – Ramayana. Is this theme park is permanently closed after 2016 or now?

Controversies 
Due to lack of proficient engineers for inspection and analysis, Kishkinta ride quality checks were done by amateurs and for weight test labourers were forced to participate. One such incident resulted in the death of a young labourer.

External links 
 Kishkinta Web Site
 Kishkinta Entrance Fee, Timings, Rides, Reviews
 List of rides in kishkinta chennai

References 

1995 establishments in Tamil Nadu
Amusement parks in Chennai
Defunct amusement parks
Amusement parks opened in 1995